La Grange High School is a public high school in La Grange, Texas (US).  It is a part of the La Grange Independent School District located in central Fayette County.  In 2015, the school was rated "Met Standard" by the Texas Education Agency.

School song
We pledge dear Alma mater,
To wear your purple and gold,
To defend your name and banner,
As students did of old,
As our band plays on the side lines,
And our team fights on the field,
The spirit of your followers will never let you yield.
In all of life's great struggles,
That any of us may face,
We pledge the same devotion, to bring you honor and grace.

According to tradition, fans and students are to make the letter "L" with their hand during the school song.

Fight song
And when the dear old Leopards fall in line,
We'll win a game another time,
And for the Leopards we will yell and yell,
And for the Leopards we will yell and yell and yell,
And we will fight, fight, fight, for every yard,
We'll circle in and hit that line so hard,
That we will roll old (School Name),
In the sod, in the sod, Rah! Rah!Fight-Fight-Fight.''

Athletics
La Grange High School is classified as a 4A school by the UIL. The La Grange Leopards compete in these sports.

Cross Country, Volleyball, Football, Basketball, Powerlifting, Swimming, Soccer, Golf, Tennis, Track, Softball & Baseball

State titles
 Football
 1975 (2A), 2000 (3A/D2)
 Baseball
 1973 (3A), 2001 (3A), 2004 (3A), 2013 (3A)
 Girls Softball
 2005 (3A), 2014 (3A), 2016 (4A)
 Boys Track
 1923 (B)

Notable athletes
 Johnnie Johnson – Member of the Los Angeles Rams from 1980 to 1988.  Played Safety for the University of Texas from 1976 to 1979.  Unanimous All-America selection at defensive back in 1978 and 1979.  Elected to College Football Hall of Fame on in 2007.
 Homer Bailey – Cincinnati Reds Pitcher (Drafted #7 in 2004 MLB Draft, pitched two no-hitters.)
 Jeff Kelly – Linebacker for Kansas State University.  Member of the Atlanta Falcons from 1999–2002 and Toronto Argonauts in 2006.
 Trey Supak – Pitcher for Pittsburgh Pirates. (Drafted #73 Overall in The 2014 First-year Player Draft.)
J.K. Dobbins – Running back for the Ohio State Buckeyes 2017–2019. Running back for the Baltimore Ravens

References

External links
 La Grange ISD

Schools in Fayette County, Texas
Public high schools in Texas